Nauen is a small town in the Havelland district, in Brandenburg, Germany. It is chiefly known for Nauen Transmitter Station, the world's oldest preserved radio transmitting installation.

Geography
It is one of Germany's largest municipalities by area, comprising Nauen proper and fourteen surrounding villages, including Ribbeck whose landowners were perpetuated in Theodor Fontane's poem Herr von Ribbeck auf Ribbeck im Havelland.

History

The settlement of Nowen was first mentioned in an 1186 deed issued by the Bishop of Brandenburg. The citizens received town privileges by the Brandenburg margraves in 1292; a first town hall was built in 1302. The Ascanian margrave Waldemar vested Nauen with market rights in 1317. A Jewish community already existed in medieval times.

During the Thirty Years' War, in 1631, Nauen was devastated by Imperial troops led by Field Marshal Count Johann Tserclaes of Tilly. On 27 June 1675, Swedish and Brandenburg troops met at the Battle of Nauen during the Scanian War. Under Prussian rule, Nauen became a garrison town. In 1846 it received access to the Berlin–Hamburg Railway.

Nauen is well known for the location of a transmission site. It was used from 1906 to 1945 for VLF and shortwave. After 1945 the installations were dismantled, but after 1955 the GDR started building up a shortwave transmission center at Nauen. Since 1997 four turnable shortwave transmission aerials have been sited there.

Demography

Twin towns - sister cities
Nauen is twinned with:
 Kreuztal, Germany
 Spandau (Berlin), Germany

Notable people

 Michael Werner (born 1939), art dealer
 Jürgen Drews (born 1945), pop singer
 Udo Schnelle (born 1952), theologian, professor at the Martin Luther University of Halle-Wittenberg
 Jochen Kowalski (born 1954), born in Wachow, an opera singer, countertenor
 Klaus-Dieter Kurrat (born 1955), athlete, medalist of 1976 Olympic Games
 Claudia Hoffmann (born 1982), hurdler

See also
Nauen Transmitter Station
Nain, Iran

References

External links

Localities in Havelland